Stephanie Grauer (born March 23, 1997) is a Canadian rower.

Career
Grauer is a two time U-23 World Champion in the women's eights boat, in 2017 and 2018. Later in 2018, Grauer helped the senior women's eights boat to a silver at the World Championships. In 2019, Grauer was part of the coxless four boat, finishing in eighth at the World Championships and qualifying Canada the boat for the 2020 Summer Olympics.

In June 2021, Grauer was named to Canada's 2020 Olympic team in the women's coxless four boat.

References

1997 births
Canadian female rowers
Living people
Rowers from Vancouver
Rowers at the 2020 Summer Olympics
21st-century Canadian women